Helen of Troy is a 2003 British-American television miniseries based upon Homer's story of the Trojan War, as recounted in the epic poem, Iliad. The series was entirely shot on location in Malta.

Plot
The film begins with the birth of Paris, and Cassandra's prophecy that he would be the cause of Troy's destruction. Paris' father, King Priam, leaves him on Mount Ida, where he is raised by the shepherd Agelaus. When he is grown (in what is known as the Judgement of Paris), he encounters the goddesses Hera, Athena, and Aphrodite, who ask him to judge which of them is the most beautiful. Hera offers him power and Athena offers him victory, but he chooses Aphrodite, who promises him the love of the most beautiful woman in the world. 

In Sparta, Helen of Troy meets Agamemnon, who has come to claim her sister Clytemnestra as his bride but is attracted to Helen. Helen is kidnapped by two Athenians, including Theseus. Her brother Pollux raids Athens to rescue her but Theseus kills Pollux. In a rage, Helen's father Tyndareus presents her to the many suitors who seek her hand. Various men compete and she is married to Menelaus. The other suitors swear an oath to wage war against anyone who disrespects her husband's claim  to her.

Paris is sent to Sparta to draw out a peace treaty with Menelaus, which angers Agamemnon. The treaty is refused and Menelaus and Agamemnon plot to have him murdered. Paris meets Helen; he gains her love and the two flee to Troy. Menelaus demands that his brother wage war on Troy and the former suitors are gathered to fulfill their oath. When the Greeks arrive to demand the return of Helen, Priam refuses. The Greeks attack and occupy Troy.

The war rages on. Agamemnon agrees to end it if, in a single dual, Menelaus wins over Paris. Agamemnon poisons Menelaus' javelin. Paris is cut but Menelaus stops the fight and the two men make peace. Hector challenges Agamemnon to a duel to the death;  Achilles takes up the challenge and kills Hector. To try to save Paris, Helen attempts to surrender to Agamemnon, but Paris intervenes. Achilles charges at him, but Paris shoots Achilles in the heel. Paris is saved by Trojan soldiers but Agamemnon stabs Paris; he dies in Helen's arms.

During Paris' funeral, the Greeks appear to sail away, leaving the huge wooden Trojan Horse on the beach. It is taken into the city, but there are Greek soldiers inside the horse. When the town is asleep, the Greeks kill Priam and Hecuba. Agamemnon seats himself on Troy's throne, declaring himself emperor of the Aegean and ruler of the world. Agamemnon has Helen brought to him and rapes her. The next morning, as the Greek soldiers sack the city, Clytemnestra arrives, rescuing her sister and killing her husband. 

Helen wanders through the ruined city. At the spot where Paris, she sees his apparition. She begs him to take her with him to the afterlife but he says that she must wait for her time. A compassionate Menelaus takes her back to Sparta, where they will reign as king and queen. Troy, once the richest kingdom of all, is left in ruins.

Cast
Sienna Guillory as Helen
Matthew Marsden as Paris
Rufus Sewell as Agamemnon
James Callis as Menelaus
Daniel Lapaine as Hector
John Rhys-Davies as King Priam of Troy
Stellan Skarsgård as Theseus
Maryam d'Abo as Queen Hecuba
Emilia Fox as Cassandra, Princess of Troy
Nigel Whitmey as Odysseus
Joe Montana as Achilles
Katie Blake as Clytemnestra
Craig Kelly as Pollux

Awards
Visual Effects Society -  winner - Outstanding Models and Miniatures in a Televised Program, Music Video, or Commercial
Visual Effects Society -  nominee - Outstanding Visual Effects in a Television Miniseries, Movie, or Special
Primetime Emmy Awards - nominee - Outstanding Makeup for a Miniseries, Movie or a Special 
Art Directors Guild - nominee - Excellence in Production Design
Motion Picture Sound Editors - nominee - Golden Reel Award for Best Sound Editing in Television Long Form
Online Film & Television Association - nominee - Best Miniseries
Online Film & Television Association - nominee - Best Production Design in a Motion Picture or Miniseries
Satellite Awards - nominee - Best Miniseries

External links

2003 American television series debuts
2003 American television series endings
2003 films
2003 television films
2000s American television miniseries
Agamemnon
Cultural depictions of Helen of Troy
Films based on the Iliad
Films directed by John Kent Harrison
Films scored by Joel Goldsmith
Films set in ancient Greece
Television series based on classical mythology
Television shows based on the Iliad
Trojan War films